Jefferson Douglas Damião Correia (born August 6, 1993 in Coelho Neto, Maranhão), known as Jefferson Maranhão, is a Brazilian football attacking midfielder who currently plays for Jacuipense on loan from Santa Cruz.

Honours
Santa Cruz
Campeonato Pernambucano: 2011, 2012, 2013
Campeonato Brasileiro Série C: 2013

External links
  Ogol
  Soccerway
  Sambafoot

1993 births
Living people
Brazilian footballers
Santa Cruz Futebol Clube players
Association football midfielders